was the last and biggest of four crackdowns on Christians in Urakami Village, Nagasaki, Japan in the 19th century.

Christianity was prohibited in Japan for 259 years, from 1614 after the Catholic Church was seen as a threat, when Nagasaki had grown prosperous through trade with Portugal, local lords and their minions had converted, and tracts of land had been donated to the Church.  Urakami Village was one of the areas that had been donated. The first three of the crackdowns there were minor incidents, however the last, the Urakami Yoban Kuzure in 1869 (the second year of Meiji), was severe.

It was triggered by the re-baptism of "Secret Christians" who had been discovered by a French Priest, Father Bernard Petitjean. Under the Tokugawa Shogunate everyone had to belong to a Buddhist temple to prove that they were not Christian. Those who were found to be Christian were tortured for information on other Christians and then executed. So, the discovery of one Secret Christian usually led to a number of them being executed. A small group of Secret Christians confessed their true beliefs to Father Petitjean at the recently completed Ōura Catholic Church. They were found to have drifted from Catholic doctrine over their 250 years in hiding and therefore deemed in need of rebaptism. This meant renouncing their Buddhist faith and in so doing directly challenging the Tokugawa Shogunate. The Nagasaki Magistrate decided to arrest the whole village. In the early hours of 4 June 1867 the crackdown began with 170 officers arresting and torturing 68 residents of Urakami and trying to force conversions out of them. This led to protests from foreign consuls, and the Tokugawa Shogunate relented. However, soon after Tokugawa Shogunate ended and in February 1868 the new Meiji government appointed Sawa Nobuyoshi in charge of public order in Kyūshū. His dislike of all things foreign was well known, and, after consultation, he decided to deal with the problem once and for all. His plan to exile the entire village was approved by an Imperial council on 25 April and implemented in two stages: first the ringleaders to Hagi, Tsuwano and Fukuyama, and then the rest of the village. Families were split up, and in total 3,414 Christian men, women, and children were sent into exile to all over Japan: 500 to Kanazawa, 160 to Tsuwano, 150 to Satsuma, 117 to Tsuru Shima, Okayama, etc.

While their fate, after being exiled, appears to have depended much on the local magistrates, wardens, and other authorities, forced labor and forced conversions were the norm. About 680 or 20% of them died during their internment in various penal colonies. Religious freedom was finally granted in 1873 and the prohibition on Christianity was lifted allowing the internees to return to Urakami.

As recently as 2008 ecclesiastical guidance was given in an effort to help overcome the "unrelenting criticism" suffered by apostates and their descendants.

References

History of Christianity in Japan
Religious policy in Japan